Peter Schalk (born 7 June 1961) is a Dutch non-executive director and also a politician of the Reformed Political Party (SGP). Since 9 June 2015, he has been a member of the Senate, and also Senate group leader.

Schalk studied at the Reformed teachers' college Driestar Hogeschool in Gouda, and subsequently worked as an educator. Nowadays he is a member of the board of directors of the reformed Reformatorisch Maatschappelijke Unie.

Peter Schalk is married, has five children and lives in Veenendaal. He is a member of the Reformed Congregations.

References 
  Parlement.com biography

External links 
  Senate biography

1961 births
Living people
Dutch corporate directors
Dutch educators
Members of the Senate (Netherlands)
People from Haarlemmermeer
Dutch Calvinist and Reformed Christians
Reformed Political Party politicians